The 1996 European Race Walking Cup was held in A Coruña, Spain, on April 20, 1996.

Complete results were published. Medal winners were published on the Athletics Weekly website,

Medallists

Results

Men's 20 km

Team (Men)

Men's 50 km

Team (Men)

Team (Men) Combined

Women's 10 km

Team (Women)

Participation
The participation of 121 athletes (80 men/41 women) from 17 countries is reported.

 (2)
 (8)
 (4)
 (1)
 (12)
 (3)
 (12)
 (1)
 (8)
 (12)
 (5)
 (8)
 (6)
 (7)
 (12)
 (12)
 (8)

References

European Race Walking Cup
European Race Walking Cup
Walk
European Race Walking Cup